Karl Hasselmann (8 May 1883 – 8 June 1966) was a German cinematographer who worked on over a hundred films during a long career. He collaborated with Ewald André Dupont on a number of productions for Gloria Film such as Whitechapel. He worked on eleven films with Karl Grune.

Hasselmann was born on 8 May 1883 in Hanover; he died at the age of 83 on 8 June 1966 in West Berlin.

Selected filmography

 The White Roses of Ravensberg (1919)
 Alkohol (1919)
 Whitechapel (1920)
 Hearts are Trumps (1920)
 The White Peacock (1920)
 The Vulture Wally (1921)
 The Conspiracy in Genoa (1921)
 Murder Without Cause (1921)
 Man Overboard (1921)
 Night and No Morning (1921)
 The Hunt for the Truth (1921)
 Othello (1922)
 A Dying Nation (1922)
 The Earl of Essex (1922)
 The Street (1923)
 Arabella (1924)
 Garragan (1924)
 Op Hoop van Zegen (1924)
 Jealousy (1925)
 Slums of Berlin (1925)
 The Iron Bride (1925)
 Comedians (1925)
 The Brothers Schellenberg (1926)
 Children of No Importance (1926)
 People to Each Other (1926)
 Sister Veronika (1927)
 The Catwalk (1927)
 Sir or Madam (1928)
 Lemke's Widow (1928)
 Under the Lantern (1928)
 Eva in Silk (1928)
 Katharina Knie (1929)
 The Convict from Istanbul (1929)
 Painted Youth (1929)
 Children of the Street (1929)
 The Man with the Frog (1929)
 Checkmate (1931)
 Between Night and Dawn (1931)
 Different Morals (1931)
 Trenck (1932)
 The Roberts Case (1933)
 What Men Know (1933)
 The Legacy of Pretoria (1934)
 The Brenken Case (1934)
 Inspector of the Red Cars (1935)
 The Hour of Temptation (1936)
 The Accusing Song (1936)
 Madame Bovary (1937)
The Secret Lie (1938)
 Men, Animals and Sensations (1938)
 Woman in the River (1939)
 The Girl at the Reception (1940)
 Clarissa (1941)
 Wild Bird (1943)
 Quartet of Five (1949)

References

Bibliography
 Bock, Hans-Michael & Bergfelder, Tim. The Concise CineGraph. Encyclopedia of German Cinema. Berghahn Books, 2009.

External links

1883 births
1966 deaths
German cinematographers
Film people from Hanover